Marcus Caelius Rufus (28 May 82 BC – after 48 BC) was an orator and politician in the late Roman Republic. He was born into a wealthy equestrian family from Interamnia Praetuttiorum (Teramo), on the central east coast of Italy. He is best known for his prosecution of Gaius Antonius Hybrida in 59 BC. He was also known for his trial for public violence (de vi publica) in March 56 BC, when Cicero defended him in the extant speech Pro Caelio, and as both recipient and author of some of the best-written letters in the ad Familiares corpus of Cicero's extant correspondence (Book 8).  He may be the Rufus named in the poems of Catullus.

Life and career
In his twenties Caelius became associated with Crassus and Cicero, while he was also briefly connected to Catiline and his conspiracy. Caelius first achieved fame through his successful prosecution in 59 BC of Gaius Antonius Hybrida for corruption. Antonius Hybrida had served as consul with Cicero for the year 63 BC, and his prosecution was a sign of the negative political atmosphere towards Cicero at the time. A year later, in 58 BC, Cicero was exiled, through the efforts of his political enemy Publius Clodius Pulcher. Cicero was recalled from exile in 57 BC with the help of his ally Titus Annius Milo, who was tribune at the time.

Sometime around 57 BC, Caelius and Clodia are believed to have had an affair which ended acrimoniously. In 56, Caelius was prosecuted for vis (violence), specifically for murdering an ambassador. He was successfully defended by Crassus and, more famously, Cicero, whose speech Pro Caelio argued that the prosecutor, Atratinus, was being manipulated by Clodia to get revenge on Caelius for an affair gone wrong.

Caelius was tribune of the plebs in 52 and curule aedile in 50.  During this period he wrote a series of witty and informative letters to Cicero, who was serving as proconsul of Cilicia at the time. After much hesitation, Caelius sided with Julius Caesar against Pompey in the civil war, warning Cicero accordingly not to align his fortunes with Pompey:  in 48 BC he was rewarded with the office of praetor peregrinus (“judge of suits involving foreigners”). However, when his proposed program of debt relief was opposed by the Senate and he was suspended from office, he joined in a rebellion against Caesar which was quickly crushed. It was during this rebellion that Caelius was killed.

In Catullus
Caelius may appear in the poetry of Catullus under his cognomen Rufus. Rufus in Carmen 69 and 77 as suggested by Riese to be Caelius, rejected by Robinson Ellis. Catullus writes about a former friend named Rufus who betrayed him in an unspecified way, perhaps referring to the affair with Clodia (usually identified with the loved then reviled "Lesbia" of Catullus's poetry), the alleged attempt of Caelius to poison her, or subsequent attacks on her through Cicero (see pro Caelio). Catullus lambastes this Rufus in an epigram that ends:
You ripped it away, alas, alas cruel poison of our lifealas, alas destroyer of our friendship.

In Caelius in 58, Catullus seems to expect a sympathetic ear as he bewails Lesbia's sexual profligacy; the former is an invective that taunts Rufus for bodily offensiveness that drives away women.

In imperial historiography
A flamboyant, witty, ambitious and quarrelsome character, Caelius attracted much attention from the minor historian Velleius Paterculus in the following century.<ref>S Usher, The Historians of Greece and Rome' (London 1969) p. 242</ref>

In popular culture
 Marcus Caelius Rufus appears in multiple books in the Steven Saylor's Roma Sub Rosa series of historical novels set during the fall of the Roman Republic. 
 Rufus features prominently in the Cicero novels by British novelist Robert Harris.

Primary source
 Cic. Brut. 79.273
 Quint. Inst. VI. 3.69
Quint. Inst. X. 1. 115
 Quint. Inst. X.2.25
 Tac. Dial. 18, 21, 25
 Pliny, N.H 7.165

Bibliography
Ancient Sources
 Clark, Albert Curtis (ed.) Oxford Classical Texts, M. Tulli Ciceronis Orationes vol. I (Oxford University Press, 1905)
- pro Sex. Roscio Amerino (pp. 1–58)
- de imperio Cn. Pompei ad Quirites (pp. 59–90)
- pro A. Cluentio (pp. 91–184)
- In L. Catilinam (orationes IV) (pp. 185–242)
-- I. oratio qua L. Catilinam emisit, in Senatu habita-- II.oratio secunda, habita ad populum-- III.oratio tertia, habita ad populum-- IV. oratio quarta, habita in Senatu- pro L. Murenam (pp. 243–292)
- pro M. Caelio (pp. 293–333)

Modern works
 Boissier, G:  Cicero and his friends : a study of Roman society in the time of Caesar (1897) 
 Austin, R G:  M. Tulli Ciceronis pro M. Caelio oratio, 3rd edition (Oxford University Press, 1960),
- Introduction with bibliography (i-xxxii)
- Latin text (1-39)
- Commentary (40-143)
- Appendices and Addenda (144-175)
- Indices (176-180)
 Volponi, M:  "M. Celio Rufo, ingeniose nequam", MIL 31.3 (1970), 197-280
 Sumner, Graham V:  The Orators in Cicero's Brutus: Prosopography and Chronology (Phoenix supplementary volume 11, University of Toronto Press, 1973)
 Alexander, Michael C:  Trials in the Late Roman Republic, 149 BC to 50 BC'' (Phoenix supplementary volume 26, University of Toronto Press, 1990)

References

External links
Encyclopædia Britannica Marcus Caelius Rufus
 E. T. Merrill, Commentary on Catullus, Intr. 59
Robinson Ellis, A commentary on Catullus, lix, note 1

82 BC births
40s BC deaths
1st-century BC Romans
Ancient Roman politicians
Rufus, Marcus
Correspondents of Cicero
Curule aediles
People from Teramo
Roman-era inhabitants of Italy
Tribunes of the plebs